Farmanova Aynur Ramiz (9 August 1972, Baku, Azerbaijan SSR) is a Lecturer of the Academy of Public Administration under the President of the Republic of Azerbaijan (2002). She is also a Doctor of Philosophy in Political Science (2017), Senior Lecturer (2011), and an Associate Professor (2019).

Life 
Aynur Farmanova was born on August 9, 1972, in Baku. In 1979, she entered the first class of school No. 31 in Baku, and in 1989 she finished secondary school.

In 1989, she entered the English and German Department of the English language faculty of the Azerbaijan State University of Languages and graduated in 1994. From 1995 to 2001 she worked as a teacher at the school No. 267 in Binagadi district, in Baku. In 2002, she worked at the Languages Department of the Academy of Public Administration under the President of the Republic of Azerbaijan from 2001.

At the meeting of the Dissertation Council FD 02.101 at the Academy of Public Administration under the President of the Republic of Azerbaijan on November 30, 2016, she defended her dissertation on the topic “The role of cooperation with UNESCO in the development of international relations of Azerbaijan”.

The name of Doctor of Philosophy in Political Science is given to her by the Decision of the Supreme Attestation Commission under the President of the Republic of Azerbaijan dated June 16, 2017 (Protocol No. 16-K), the academic title of Associate Professor at the Department of Languages  is given to her by the Decision of the Supreme Attestation Commission under the President of the Republic of Azerbaijan  dated July 22, 2019 (Protocol No..14-K)

She participated at the International Conference dedicated to the 20th anniversary of the independence of the Republic of Azerbaijan and the establishment of the Khazar University, as well as at the Academy of Public Administration under the President of the Republic of Azerbaijan, she completed a short-term course on the Foreign Policy of the Republic of Azerbaijan.

She teaches “Professional English” at the Faculty of Political Administration at the Academy of Public Administration under the President of the Republic of Azerbaijan.

Her scientific and pedagogical experience is 24 years. She has 20 scientific and educational-methodical works, 5 of them were published after her thesis defense. Among them are 1 book, 1 textbook, 1 subject program, 17 scientific articles (5 in English, 1 in Russian and 1 in Turkish).

She has been a member of the New Azerbaijan Party (Yeni Azərbaycan Partiyası) since 2002.

Family 
She is married.

Books 
1.	English-Azerbaijani abbreviations used in international documents. - Baku, Mutarcim, 2007, 100 p.

2.	Professional English in Use International Relations. - Bakı, Zardabi, 2018, 208 p.

3.	The program of "Foreign language" (English). - Baku, Zardabi, 2018, 26 p.

Articles 

1.	Heydar Aliyev and language establishment in Azerbaijan. - Materials of the scientific conference of postgraduate students and scholars, dedicated to the "80th anniversary of Heydar Aliyev", APA, Baku, 2003, p. 197-198.

2.	The essence of the state language in the Republic of Azerbaijan. - Journal of Scientific News, Azerbaijan University of Languages, Baku, 2004, No.. 1, p. 100-101.

3.	Forms of organization in the pedagogical process. - “Heydar Aliyev's rich political, moral legacy is our national wealth”, Materials of the Conference of Post-Graduate and PhD Students, APA, Baku, 2004, p. 113-114.

4.	Problems of language establishment in the history of statehood. - Journal of Scientific News, Azerbaijan University of Languages, Baku, 2005, No.1, p. 225-227

5.	Materials of the Scientific Conference of Post-Graduate and PhD students on the Issues of Language Establishment in the History of Azerbaijan Statehood on the theme - “On the Way of Political and Economic Progress of the Republic of Azerbaijan”, APA, Baku, 2005, p. 204–207

6.	The role of information and communication technologies in teaching foreign languages. - Materials of the Scientific and Practical Conference on the theme - "Application of Information Technology in Public Administration", Baku, 2008, p 60–62.

7.	Azerbaijan's international cultural relations in the context of cooperation with UNESCO and ISESCO. An international symposium dedicated to the 20th anniversary of the independence of the Republic of Azerbaijan and the establishment of the Khazar University. Khazar University Press, Baku, 2012, p. 459- 467.

8.	The role of cooperation with UNESCO in the expansion of international relations of Azerbaijan. - Journal of “Geostrategy”,  No. 02 (14), March - April, Baku, 2013, p. 55-60.

9.	The role of Heydar Aliyev in the expansion of Azerbaijan-UNESCO cooperation. - Materials of the scientific conference of PhD students on the theme of "Heydar Aliyev is the founder of the independent Republic of Azerbaijan ", Baku, 2013, p. 202– 211.

10.	Directions and dynamics of development of cooperation between Azerbaijan and UNESCO. - “Law and Political Science” International Scientific Journal, Chisinau, No. 26, June 2014, p. 66-70.

11.	The Role of Cooperation with UNESCO in the Extension of Azerbaijan's International Relations. Journal of Social Sciences Research. Year: IX, Number: 22, September-2013, p. 123-132.

12.	Directions and dynamics of development of Azerbaijan-UNESCO cooperation. - Journal of "Public Administration": theory and practice. Scientific-theoretical and practical journal. 2013, No.. 3 (43), p. 213-22.

13.	The role of cooperation with UNESCO in the development of international relations of the Republic of Azerbaijan. - “Science and world” International scientific journal, Russia, Volgograd, 2016, No.9 (37), Vol I, p. 88-92.

14.	The main priorities and dynamics of the development of Azerbaijan-UNESCO cooperation (1992-2017). - Journal of "Public Administration": theory and practice. Scientific-theoretical and practical journal.  2017, No.2(58), p. 297- 304.

15.	Mrs.Mehriban Aliyeva's role in expanding of International-Cultural Relations of Azerbaijan - Journal of "Public Administration": theory and practice. Scientific-theoretical and practical journal.. 2018, No.2(62), p. 161-170.

16.	Development Dynamics of Azerbaijan – UNESCO Cooperation: Success and Achievements -Journal of "Public Administration": theory and practice. Scientific-theoretical and practical journal..2019, No.1(65), p. 171-180.

17.	Mrs. Mehriban Aliyeva's multifaceted activity serves to expand the international reputation of Azerbaijan - “Science and world” International Scientific Journal, Russia, Volgograd, 2019, No. 8 (72), Vol I, p. 88-92.

References 

 Fərmanova Aynur Ramiz qızı, dia.edu.az, additional text.

1972 births
Living people
Academic staff of the Academy of Public Administration (Azerbaijan)